Niels Juel Simonsen (born 16 May 1846 in Copenhagen, died 25 May 1906 also in Copenhagen ) was a Danish baritone opera singer, who made his debut in 1874. He gave many performances of Edvard Grieg's songs, in particular Den Bergtekne.

References 

19th-century Danish male opera singers
Operatic baritones
Singers from Copenhagen